The coat of arms of Bratislava, Slovakia, has been used since 1436, when Sigismund of Luxembourg granted the town the right to use its own coat of arms. The coat of arms depicts, on a red late Gothic background, a silver three-towered fortification with a gate in the centre. There are two golden spheres on top of each tower and a golden half-raised portcullis in the gate.

It is a common misconception that the coat of arms represents the Bratislava Castle or any of the city's four medieval gates (Michael's Gate, Laurinc Gate, Fish [or Fishermen's] Gate or Vydrica Gate). In reality, it simply shows a general depiction of a medieval town.

See also

 Coat of arms of Slovakia

References

External links

 Coat of arms of Bratislava

Bratislava
Bratislava
Culture in Bratislava
History of Bratislava
Bratislava
Bratislava
Bratislava